Khurram Manzoor (born 10 June 1986) is a Pakistani international cricketer. He is a right-hand opening batsman who also bowls off-spin and he made his first-class cricket debut in the 2003–04 season before representing Pakistan for the first time in the 5th One Day International (ODI) against Zimbabwe in Sheikhupura in February 2007. In total, he has played seven Tests and has scored three half centuries. He performed well in two tests for Pakistan A against West Indies A and he scored 3 centuries subsequently he was added to the Test squad for the series against New Zealand.

He has also played for Cyclones of Chittagong in Bangladesh's NCL T20 Bangladesh. Khurram Manzoor hit his maiden Test century against South Africa in Abu Dhabi UAE.

He made his Twenty20 International debut for Pakistan against India in the 2016 Asia Cup on 27 February 2016.

In January 2017 he made the most runs in the 2016–17 Regional One Day Cup, with a total of 395. He was also the leading run-scorer for Sindh in the 2017 Pakistan Cup, with 227 runs in four matches.

In April 2018, he was named in Khyber Pakhtunkhwa's squad for the 2018 Pakistan Cup. On 28 April 2018, in the match against Punjab, he scored 190 not out, his highest total in List A cricket. In Khyber Pakhtunkhwa's next match of the tournament, he scored 111 runs. He finished the tournament as the leading run-scorer, with 393 runs in four matches. He was also the leading run-scorer in the 2018–19 Quaid-e-Azam Trophy, with 886 runs in eight matches.

In March 2019, he was named in Punjab's squad for the 2019 Pakistan Cup. In the final group stage match of the tournament, he scored 168 runs from 116 balls, the highest individual total in the tournament.

In September 2019, he was named in Sindh's squad for the 2019–20 Quaid-e-Azam Trophy tournament.

References

External links
 

1986 births
Living people
Pakistani cricketers
Pakistan Test cricketers
Pakistan One Day International cricketers
Pakistan Twenty20 International cricketers
Pakistan International Airlines cricketers
Karachi Dolphins cricketers
Sindh cricketers
Karachi Blues cricketers
Cricketers from Karachi
Port Qasim Authority cricketers
Karachi Urban cricketers
Karachi Whites cricketers
Karachi Zebras cricketers
Karachi Kings cricketers
National Bank of Pakistan cricketers
Chittagong Division cricketers
Quetta Gladiators cricketers